Hwang Chi-yeul (born 3 December 1982) is a South Korean singer, TV show host of Immortal Songs 2, and former competitor of I Am a Singer (season 4) (placed 3rd in the finals). He made his official debut in 2007, releasing a digital single album, Chi Yeul

TV shows

I Am a Singer season four

Immortal Songs 2 (Immortal Songs: Singing the Legend)

References 

South Korean filmographies